Carl (Karl) Adloff (12 January 1819 – 16 April 1863) was a German painter of the Düsseldorf school of painting.

Life 
Born in Düsseldorf, Adloff was the child of Franz Joseph Adloff (1786-1832) and Anna Margaretha Adloff, née Kaimer (1784-1846). From 1833 to 1843, he studied at the Kunstakademie Düsseldorf, where in 1836 he took the class of Landschaftsmaler under Johann Wilhelm Schirmer. and attended the architecture class under Rudolf Wiegmann in 1840/1841. In the student lists of the Meisterklasse, he was listed as an architectural and landscape painter from 1840 to 1843. In his choice of motifs, he favoured - following the Dutch Golden Age painting - the Dutch landscape; he created beach, harbour, canal and city views, whose architecture he captured in detail and in a fine painting style. He often painted seascapes, which are bathed in a romantic mood of tranquillity by moonlight, morning and evening light. He was repeatedly represented at academic art exhibitions in Germany and abroad. Adloff was a member of the Malkasten.

Adloff married Adelheid Schmitz (1820-1893), who gave birth to his daughter Sybilla Carolina († 1927) in 1850. They lived at Pfannenschoppenstraße 239 (today Klosterstraße in Düsseldorf-Stadtmitte) - in the house where Alwine and Adolph Schroedter had lived before they went to Karlsruhe. Sybilla Carolina became the wife of the animal painter  in 1868. and 1873 mother of the later landscape painter Carl Ernst Bernhard Jutz.

Work 

 Burgruine, ca. 1840
 Holländischer Kanal, 1841
 Hafenpartie bei Amsterdam, 1846
 Winteransicht von Dordrecht, 1849.
 Landungsplatz in Dordrecht, 1851
 Ansicht von Ehrenbreitstein und Koblenz, 1854
 Seehafen im Sonnenlicht, 1857
 Morgen an der Zuiderzee, 1861, Museum Kunstpalast.
 Fluss, mit Booten und Schiffen, 1861.

References

Further reading 
 Rudolf Wiegmann: Die Königliche Kunst-Akademie zu Düsseldorf, Buddeus Verlag, Düsseldorf 1856, .
 Julius Meyer: Karl Adloff. In Julius Meyer, Georg Kaspar Nagler: Neues Allgemeines Künstler-Lexikon, first vol., Verlag Wilhelm von Engelmann, Leipzig 1872, . (Online).
 Hermann Board: Adloff, Karl. In Ulrich Thieme, Felix Becker (ed.): Allgemeines Lexikon der Bildenden Künstler von der Antike bis zur Gegenwart. Founded by Ulrich Thieme and Felix Becker. Vol. 1: Aa–Antonio de Miraguel. Wilhelm Engelmann, Leipzig 1907,  (Textarchiv – Internet Archive).
 Hans Wolfgang Singer (ed.): Allgemeines Künstler-Lexikon. First volume, Fifth unaltered edition, Rütten & Loening, Frankfurt, 1921,  (Numerized).
 Martin Faass, Felix Krämer, Uwe M. Schneede (ed.): Seestücke. Von Caspar David Friedrich bis Emil Nolde. Prestel Verlag, Munich 2005, .

External links 

 Adloff, Carl, short biography at stiftung-volmer.de
 Karl Adloff, Auktionsresultate im Portal artnet.com
 Karl Adloff, Auktionsresultate im Portal arcadja.com

19th-century German painters
19th-century German male artists
German landscape painters
German marine artists
1819 births
1863 deaths
Artists from Düsseldorf